The 2019 Tokyo Marathon ( 2019) was the thirteenth edition of the annual marathon race in Tokyo and was held on Sunday, 3 March. An IAAF Gold Label Road Race, it was the first World Marathon Majors event to be held that year. The men's race was won by Birhanu Legese in 2:04:48 hours (the second fastest time recorded in Japan) while the women's race was won by Ruti Aga in 2:20:40.

The marathon race had a total of 37,604 starters. Male entrants outnumbered women by more than 3 to 1 (28,664 against 8,905), which was similarly reflected in the wheelchair division with its 26 men and 9 women. In terms of competitive standard, a total of 906 men and 555 women entered with a semi-elite personal best.  Of the 35,460 finishers for the marathon that year, the largest contingent was from Tokyo Prefecture (10,387). Around 8500 entrants came from the prefectures of Kanagawa, Saitama and Chiba, which were the only other regions in excess of 1000 entrants. Overseas athletes numbered 7431 – around one fifth of the total. The estimated number of spectators on the course was 690,000.

In terms of the 12th World Marathon Majors rankings, the result brought Birhanu Legese to joint first in the men's side with 25 points while Ruti Aga's win brought her into first place outright with 41 points (building upon her runner-up finish at the 2018 Berlin Marathon). In the wheelchair division, Daniel Romanchuk kept a two-point lead over Marcel Hug and Manuela Schär extended her lead to 76 points, ahead of Tatyana McFadden.

It was a cold and wet edition of the race, with temperatures holding steady around 5 to 6 degrees celsius. This resulted in several high profile mid-race dropouts, including Japan's national record holder Suguru Osako and elite Africans El Hassan El-Abbassi and Gideon Kipketer.

For the Japanese elite runners, the marathon formed part of qualification into the Japanese team for the 2020 Tokyo Olympics. Kensuke Horio was the top male national finisher and, along with Masato Imai and Takuya Fujikawa, gained a place for the Marathon Grand Championship race scheduled for September. None of the women in the race gained qualification in Tokyo, leaving the Nagoya Women's Marathon and Lake Biwa Marathon as the final venues to do so.

Results

Men

Women

Wheelchair men

Wheelchair women

References

Results
March 3 2019 Tokyo Marathon Results
Men's Elite Race. Tokyo Marathon. Retrieved 2019-04-22.
Women's Elite Race. Tokyo Marathon. Retrieved 2019-04-22.
Wheelchair men. Tokyo Marathon. Retrieved 2019-04-22.
Wheelchair women. Tokyo Marathon. Retrieved 2019-04-22.

Tokyo Marathon
Tokyo
2019 in Tokyo
Tokyo Marathon
Tokyo Marathon